The 2013 Swiss Cup Basel was held from October 3 to 6 at the Curlingzentrum Region Basel in Arlesheim, Switzerland as part of the 2013–14 World Curling Tour. The event was held in a round robin format, and the purse for the event was CHF 43,200, of which the winner, Thomas Ulsrud, received CHF 14,000. Ulsrud defeated Oskar Eriksson in the final with a score of 6–3.

Teams
The teams are listed as follows:

Round robin standings
Final Round Robin Standings

Playoffs

References

External links

2013 in curling